During the 1999–2000 English football season, Nottingham Forest competed in the Football League First Division.

Season summary
Under the management of David Platt, Forest were expected to make a push for an immediate return to the Premier League, but it all went wrong for Forest and they never looked anywhere near attempting a promotion challenge. In fact, they finished the season closer to a second successive relegation than the play-off places, let alone the automatic promotion places.

Final league table

Results summary

Results by round

Results
Nottingham Forest's score comes first

Legend

Football League First Division

FA Cup

League Cup

First-team squad
Squad at end of season

Left club during season

Reserve squad

References

Nottingham Forest F.C. seasons
Nottingham Forest F.C.